The Roman Catholic Diocese of Okigwe is a diocese located in the city of Okigwe, Imo State in the Ecclesiastical province of Owerri in Nigeria.

As at 2016, the diocese has 43 missions, 219 lay religious (33 brothers, 186 sisters), and 198 seminarians.

History
 January 24, 1981: Established as Diocese of Okigwe from the Diocese of Umuahia

Special churches
The Cathedral is St. Mary's Cathedral in Okigwe.

Leadership
 Bishops of Okigwe
 Bishop Anthony Ekezia Ilonu (January 24, 1981 – April 22, 2006)
 Bishop Solomon Amanchukwu Amatu (since April 22, 2006)

See also
Roman Catholicism in Nigeria

References

External links
 Official website of the Diocese of Okigwe
 GCatholic.org Information
 Catholic Hierarchy

Roman Catholic dioceses in Nigeria
Christian organizations established in 1981
Roman Catholic dioceses and prelatures established in the 20th century
Roman Catholic Ecclesiastical Province of Owerri